Kosovo competed at the 2022 Mediterranean Games in Oran, Algeria from 25 June to 6 July 2022.

Medal summary

Medal table

|  style="text-align:left; width:78%; vertical-align:top;"|

|  style="text-align:left; width:22%; vertical-align:top;"|

Archery 

Men

Athletics

Men

Track & road events

Field events

Badminton

Men

Boxing

Men

Gymnastics

Artistic

Men

Women

Judo
 

Men

Women

Karate 

Men

Women

Shooting

Kosovo competed in shooting.

Men

Swimming 

Men

Women

Table tennis

Men's

Taekwondo
 

Men

Tennis 

Men

Women

Wrestling

Men's freestyle

References

External links
Kosovo at the 2022 Mediterranean Games

Nations at the 2022 Mediterranean Games
2022
Mediterranean Games